Antoine Jimenez (9 May 1929 – 19 November 2019) was a French rugby league player and coach who represented France in two Rugby League World Cups.

Personal life
Outside the pitch, he was a teacher.

Playing career
A great promise of rugby union under the colours of Pau, however, Jimenez chose to play rugby league for Villeneuve.

Jimenez made his debut for France against England in 1953, as part of that year's European Championship. He was part of the French squad for the 1954 and 1957 Rugby League World Cups. In 1959 he played in two test matches against the touring Australian side, captaining the side in one of the matches. His last internationals were in 1960, as part of a tour of New Zealand.

After his player career, Jimenez became the first national technical director for the French Rugby League Federation between 1960 and 1978.

Later years
Jimenez coached France in one test match, against Australia on 21 June 1975 at Lang Park.

References

1929 births
2019 deaths
France national rugby league team captains
France national rugby league team coaches
France national rugby league team players
French rugby league coaches
French rugby league players
Rugby league centres
Rugby league five-eighths
Sportspeople from Pyrénées-Atlantiques
Villeneuve Leopards players
People from Soule